The 2019 FIA World Rally Championship-2 Pro was the first season of the World Rally Championship-2 Pro, an auto racing championship for rally cars that is recognised by the Fédération Internationale de l'Automobile as the second-highest tier of international rallying. The category was created in 2019 and open to cars entered by manufacturers and complying with Group R5 regulations. The World Rally Championship-2 was open to privately entered cars.

Calendar

Entries

Crew changes 
Škoda Motorsport scaled back their involvement in the championship to a single two-car team. The team retained defending drivers' champion Jan Kopecký and Kalle Rovanperä, while 2017 champions Pontus Tidemand and Jonas Andersson left the team. Tidemand later joined WRC team M-Sport Ford on a part-time basis, while Andersson remained in the World Rally Championship-2, partnering Ole Christian Veiby. M-Sport Ford WRT will also enter two cars, one for Polish driver Łukasz Pieniążek and the other for Gus Greensmith and Elliott Edmondson. Greensmith will also make his World Rally Car début with M-Sport Ford WRT. Reigning two-time French Rally champion Yoann Bonato, who competed for privateer Citroën team CHL Sport Auto in 2018, was entered by the factory Citroën team for Monte Carlo, before Citroën withdrew their entry from the rally, leaving Bonato to run as a WRC-2 entrant. After driving for Citroën's WRC team in 2018, Mads Østberg moved to the WRC-2 in 2019, staying with Citroën's factory team in a different C3 R5, in conjunction with DG Sport. Although not a member of Škoda's factory roster, 2018 Finnish Rally Champion Eerik Pietarinen was nominated to score points for Škoda alongside factory driver Kalle Rovanperä at Rally Sweden. Škoda would repeat this practice with 18-year-old Bolivian driver Marco Bulacia Wilkinson, who is set to participate in the pro-class in the South American double-header in Argentina and Chile, joining Rovanperä on the latter rally.

Results and standings

Season summary

Scoring system
Points were awarded to the top ten classified finishers in each event.

Drivers' standings

Co-Drivers' standings

Manufacturers' standings

Footnotes

References

External links
Official website of the World Rally Championship
Official website of the Fédération Internationale de l'Automobile

 
World Rally Championship-2